is an autobahn in eastern Germany that connects the Baltic port of Rostock to the A 24, which continues to the A 10 ring road around Berlin. The Warnowtunnel is the only stretch of autobahn so far that requires the payment of a general road toll for all vehicles.

Exit list

 

 

 

 

 (Müritz) 

 

 
 
|}

External links 

19
A019
A019